Independiente is a British independent record label formed in 1997 after Andy Macdonald sold his first label Go! Discs to PolyGram in 1996 for a reported £30 million. The label, which is currently dormant, is a division of Concord Music.

The label's catalogue included albums by Travis, John Martyn, Nile, Gomez, Embrace, Paul Weller and Martina Topley-Bird. In December 2013, it was confirmed that Embrace had signed to Cooking Vinyl, leaving Independiente with no current artists on its roster. The label ceased releasing music by new artists in 2009 and has subsequently transformed itself into a profitable synchronisation business, sourcing opportunities in film and advertising for its catalogue.

Label success
The label saw a considerable amount of success in the late 1990s and early 2000s with the Travis album The Man Who being cited as the 25th biggest selling album in the UK, and their follow up The Invisible Band in 2001, along with Out of Nothing, Embrace's UK number one comeback album released in September 2004. Embrace's follow-up album This New Day also debuted at number one, becoming the band's third number one album.

Artists who have released records on Independiente 
 Archive
 Blackbud
 Crashland
 Deejay Punk-Roc
 Embrace
 David Ford
 Roddy Frame
 Gomez
 Howling Bells
 Kinesis
 Lisa Maffia
 John Martyn
 Ooberman
 Nile
 Ulrich Schnauss
 The Shortwave Set
 Snowblind
 So Solid Crew
 Sun House
 The Tears
 Martina Topley-Bird
 Tinariwen
 Travis
 Paul Weller
 White Rose Movement
 Vitro

See also
 List of record labels

References

External links
 Independiente

Record labels established in 1997
British independent record labels
Alternative rock record labels
Indie rock record labels
Electronic music record labels
Concord Music Group